Nationality words link to articles with information on the nation's poetry or literature (for instance, Irish or France).

Events
 Philippe Desportes' verses first come to public attention when they are sung during a court performance of Jean-Antoine de Baïf's Le Brave (France).

Works published

English
 Arthur Golding, Metamorphosis, Books 1–15, (translation of Ovid's Metamorphoses; see also The fyrst fower bookes 1565; many editions into the 17th century)
 George Turberville:
 The Eglogs of the Poet B. Mantuan Carmelitan, Turned into English Verse, translation and adaptation from Baptista Spagnuoli Mantuanus Adolescentia seu Bucolica)
 Epitaphs, Epigrams, Songs and Sonnets
 The Heroycall Epistles of ... Publius Ovidius Naso, in Englishe Verse, translation of Ovid's Heroides, many editions
 Isabella Whitney, The Copy of a Letter, Lately Written in Meter by a Young Gentlewoman: to her Unconstant Lover, publication year conjectural; earliest known volume of English language secular poetry published by a woman

Other
 Jean-Antoine de Baif, Le Premier des Météores, a didactic poem on astronomy, France
 Anna Bijns, Refrains, Netherlands, third edition (first edition 1528, second edition 1548)
 Pey de Garros, Poesias Gasconas, Gascon poetry, France
 Torquato Tasso, Discoursi dell'arte poetica ("Discourses on the Heroic Poem"), published from this year through 1570, Italian criticism

Births
Death years link to the corresponding "[year] in poetry" article:
 February 12 – Thomas Campion (died 1620), English composer, poet and physician
 February 27 – William Alabaster (died 1640), English poet
 November – Thomas Nashe (died c. 1601), English, pamphleteer, poet and satirist
 December 15 – Christoph Demantius (died 1643), German composer, music theorist, writer and poet
 Also:
 Valens Acidalius (died 1595), German critic and poet writing in Latin
 William Alexander, 1st Earl of Stirling, birth year uncertain (died 1640), Scottish statesman, courtier, poet and writer of rhymed tragedies
 Anthony Copley (died 1609), English Catholic poet and conspirator
 Eochaidh Ó hÉoghusa (died 1617), Irish poet
 John Salusbury (died 1612), Welsh knight, politician and poet

Deaths
Birth years link to the corresponding "[year] in poetry" article:
 May 2 – Marin Držić, also known as "Marino Darza" and "Marino Darsa" (born 1508), Croatian dramatist, author and poet
 Also:
 Thomas Beccon (born 1512), English
 Nicolaus Mameranus, year of death uncertain (born 1500), Luxembourgish poet and historian

See also

 Poetry
 16th century in poetry
 16th century in literature
 Dutch Renaissance and Golden Age literature
 Elizabethan literature
 French Renaissance literature
 Renaissance literature
 Spanish Renaissance literature

Notes

16th-century poetry
Poetry